The Free Democratic Party or Radical Democratic Party (FDP; , PRD; , PLR; , PLD) was a liberal political party in Switzerland. Formerly one of the major parties in Switzerland, on 1 January 2009 it merged with the Liberal Party of Switzerland to form FDP.The Liberals.

The FDP was formed in 1894 from the Radicals, who had dominated Swiss politics since the 1830s, standing in opposition to the Catholic conservatives, and who from the creation of the federal state in 1848 until 1891 formed the federal government.

The FDP remained dominant until the introduction of proportional representation in 1919. From 1945 to 1987, it alternated with the Social Democratic Party to be the largest party.  In 1959, the party took two seats in the magic formula.  The party declined in the 1990s and 2000s (decade), as it was put under pressure by the Swiss People's Party. In response, the party formed closer relations with the smaller Liberal Party, leading to their formal merger in 2009.

History
The elements 'liberal', 'radical' and freisinnig (an obsolete German word for 'liberal', or literally "free thinking") in the party's name originate from the conflicts during the period of Swiss Restoration between the Catholic-conservative cantons and the liberal cantons. This conflict led to the foundation of the Swiss federal state in 1848 after the victory of the predominantly Protestant and liberal cantons over the conservative and Catholic ones in the Sonderbund war.

From 1848 until 1891, the Federal Council was composed entirely of Radicals. The radical movement of the restoration was anti-clerical, and stood in opposition to the Catholic Conservative Party, the ancestor of the modern Christian Democratic People's Party. They were otherwise heterogeneous, including and classical liberal 'Liberals', federalist 'Radicals', and social liberal 'Democrats': placing the radical movement on the 'left' of the political spectrum. It was not until the rise of the Social Democratic Party in the early 20th century that the FDP found itself on the centre-right.

The FDP was the dominant party until the 1919 election, when the introduction of proportional representation led to a leap in the representation of the Social Democrats.  In 1959, the Free Democrats joined the other major parties in agreeing the 'magic formula' to divide up the seats of the Federal Council, with the FDP permanently receiving two of the seven seats.

After the 2003 elections, lawmakers of FDP and Liberal Party formed a common parliamentary group in the Federal Assembly. In June 2005, they strengthened their cooperation by founding the Radical and Liberal Union. They merged on 1 January 2009 to form FDP.The Liberals.

Election results
In 2003, it held 36 mandates (out of 200) in the Swiss National Council (first chamber of the Swiss parliament); 14 (out of 46) in the second chamber and 2 out of 7 mandates in the Swiss Federal Council (executive body). By 2005, it held 27.2% of the seats in the Swiss Cantonal governments and 19.7% in the Swiss Cantonal parliaments (index "BADAC", weighted with the population and number of seats). At the last legislative elections, 22 October 2007, the party won 15.6% of the popular vote and 31 out of 200 seats.

National Council

List of party Presidents

See also
 Liberalism and radicalism in Switzerland

Footnotes

External links
 fdp.ch in German
 prd.ch in French
 plrt.ch in Italian
 Young Liberals Switzerland official site of the youth branch, called jungfreisinnige schweiz (in German/French)

 
Classical liberal parties
Radical parties
Political parties established in 1894
Political parties disestablished in 2009
Defunct liberal political parties
Defunct political parties in Switzerland
1894 establishments in Switzerland
2009 disestablishments in Switzerland

ca:Partit Radical Democràtic de Suïssa
eo:Radikal-Demokrata Partio de Svislando
id:Partai Demokrat Bebas Swiss
la:Factio Liberalis Democratica (Helvetia)
pl:Radykalno-Demokratyczna Partia Szwajcarii
zh:瑞士自由民主黨